Isabelle Nélisse (born December 3, 2003) is a Canadian actress. The younger sister of actress Sophie Nélisse, she is most noted for her roles in the films Mama, Wait Till Helen Comes and The Tale.

She has also appeared in the films Whitewash, Mommy, Worst Case, We Get Married (Et au pire, on se mariera) and The Far Shore (Dérive), the television series The Strain, Mirador and It: Chapter One.

Filmography

Film
 Mama (2013) as Lilly
 Whitewash (2013) as Child - Cottage 
 Mommy (2014) as Fille de Kyla
 Wait Till Helen Comes (2016) as Heather 
 Worst case, We Get Married (2017) as Aïcha (enfant)
 It (2017) Girl in the bathroom 
 The Tale (2018) as Jenny 
 The Far Shore (2018) as Mélanie

Television 
 The Strain (2014) as Emma Arnot. 3 episodes 
 Mirador (2011 – 2016)

References

External links

2003 births
Living people
21st-century Canadian actresses
Canadian film actresses
Canadian television actresses
Canadian child actresses
Actresses from Windsor, Ontario
Franco-Ontarian people